Parthenius  or Parthenios (Greek: Παρθένιος) may refer to:

People
 Parthenius of Nicaea (1st-century BC–14 AD), Greek grammarian and poet
 Parthenius of Chios, Greek epic poet. Son of Thestor, attested only in Suda. Modern historians suggests that this is the real name of the Thestorides
 Saint Parthenius (died 4th-century, Rome), Armenian saint and martyr from Rome, who suffered martyrdom during the reign of Decius
 Hierarch Parthenius of Lampsacus, bishop of Lampsacus in the 4th century, Greek Orthodox patron saint of cancer patients
 One of several Greek Patriarchs of Alexandria
 One of several Ecumenical Patriarchs of Constantinople
 The chief chamberlain of Domitian (died 96)

Geography
 A river which is now named Bartın River in northern Anatolia
 Bartın, a city in Turkey
 Mount Parthenion, Greece